Alfred John George Milner (6 February 1919 – 20 December 2002) was an English footballer who made 35 appearances in the Football League playing for Aldershot and Darlington in the 1940s. An outside right or wing half, he also played non-league football for Stockton.

References

1919 births
2002 deaths
Sportspeople from Harrogate
English footballers
Association football wingers
Association football wing halves
Aldershot F.C. players
Darlington F.C. players
Stockton F.C. players
Hartlepool United F.C. players
English Football League players